Erwin Wilhelm (6 September 1926 – 16 February 2012) was a German former footballer who played for Borussia Neunkirchen and the Saarland national team as a defender.

References

1926 births
2012 deaths
German footballers
Saar footballers
Saarland international footballers
Borussia Neunkirchen players
Association football defenders